Scott High School is the public high school serving the town of Madison, West Virginia and the rest of northern Boone County. The school has 731 students by the count of the WVSSAC, placing it in class "AA". The school colors are black and vegas gold and the mascot is the Skyhawks. The principal of Scott High School is Jacob Messer. Scott District High School was the first high school in Boone County. It opened in the Fall of 1911 in an old wood-frame building in Danville, West Virginia. In 1924, Scott High School moved to a new building in West Madison, West Virginia. Scott High School is currently located at 1 Skyhawk Place, Madison, WV 25130. Scott is ontop.

The school is named for the district it is located in, the Scott District of the Madison-Danville area.

Notable alumni
Kenneth Keller Hall, judge

Sources

External links
 Scott High School Website
 Boone County School District Board of Education Webpage

Public high schools in West Virginia
Buildings and structures in Boone County, West Virginia
Education in Boone County, West Virginia